Tuft & Needle is an American mattress and bedding brand now owned by bedding manufacturer Serta Simmons Bedding. T&N was among the earliest online, bed-in-a-box marketers that launched in the early 2010s. On September 28, 2018, the online seller was acquired by Serta Simmons Bedding and the Tuft & Needle brand now is on the floor at major mattress retailers and in T&N stores, as well as online.

History 
Tuft & Needle started as an e-commerce company founded on July 19, 2012 by Daehee Park and John-Thomas Marino. Both met via the entrepreneur program at Pennsylvania State University. The company was co-founded on July 19, 2012 by Park and Marino with $3,000 of each of their personal savings.

Park and Marino grew the company to over $100 million in annual revenue with no venture funding. Within its first full year in business, the company generated $1 million in sales at the end of 2013. In April 2014, Park spoke about founding a start-up and achieving success at IST Start-Up Week, which was hosted by Pennsylvania State University. The company later opened its first brick-and-mortar showroom in the company's Phoenix headquarters in December 2014, which was made as "an experiment" and was available by appointment only.

Tuft & Needle acquired TN.com in September 2015. The company established its headquarters at the historical O.S. Stapley Hardware buildings on Grand Avenue in Phoenix in December 2015, after a city grant of $300,000 was used to improve and repair the buildings by a real estate developer. In 2015, Tuft & Needle grew to over 100 employees and earned over $100 million in revenue.

After turning down investment offers from venture capital investors, Park and Marino took out a $500,000 loan from Bond Street in 2016. In 2016, the company launched a national billboard campaign entitled "Mattress Stores Are Greedy".

In 2017, the company had $170 million in sales. Tuft & Needle spent over $14 million in media during the same year.

On September 28, 2018, Tuft and Needle closed a merger with mattresses manufacturer Serta Simmons Bedding. In November 2018, they also announced a partnership with Amazon to release an Amazon-exclusive mattress called "The Nod." by Tuft & Needle.

On January 23, 2023, Serta Simmons Bedding filed for Chapter 11 bankruptcy.

Retail presence 
As of January 2019, Tuft & Needle operates seven retail stores in Scottsdale, Gilbert, Seattle, Kansas City, Raleigh, Portland, and Dallas. Their products are also stocked at select Lowe's, Crate & Barrel and Walmart locations across the United States.

Reception 
The company has received press from Business Insider, Marketing Land, The Arizona Republic, Consumer Reports, Forbes, Phoenix Business Journal, Bloomberg, and Wired.

References

External links 
 Official website

American companies established in 2012
Mattress retailers of the United States
Manufacturing companies based in Phoenix, Arizona
Manufacturing companies established in 2012
Companies that filed for Chapter 11 bankruptcy in 2023
Privately held companies based in Arizona
2018 mergers and acquisitions